The use of free software instead of proprietary software can give institutions better control over information technology. A growing number of public institutions have started a transition to free-software solutions. This grants independence and can also address the often-argued need for public access to publicly funded developments. This is the only way that public services can ensure that citizen data is handled in a trustworthy manner since non-free software doesn't allow total control (or even knowledge) over the employed functions of the needed programs.

Asia

India

Assam
The Government of Assam state made open source a part of its IT policy.

Kerala
The Government of Kerala, India, announced its official support for free/open-source software in its State IT Policy of 2001. This was formulated after the first-ever free-software conference in India, "Freedom First!", held in July 2001 in Thiruvananthapuram, the capital of Kerala, where Richard Stallman inaugurated the Free Software Foundation of India. Kerala's Government's support for Free Software in 2001 is perhaps the earliest instance of a Government supporting the use of Free Software.

Under the IT@School project the government of Kerala has adopted free and open sourced software for the schools.

Jordan 
In January 2010, the Government of Jordan announced that it has formed a partnership with Ingres Corporation, a leading open-source database-management company based in the United States that is now known as Actian Corporation, to promote the use of open-source software starting with university systems in Jordan.

Malaysia 
Malaysia launched the "Malaysian Public Sector Open Source Software Program", saving millions on proprietary-software licences till 2008.

Europe

Austria 
In 2005 Vienna migrated from Microsoft Office 2000 to OpenOffice.org and from Microsoft Windows 2000 to Linux
.

France

National Gendarmerie
The National Gendarmerie announced in March 2009 that it will totally switch to Ubuntu by 2015. The Gendarmerie has adopted OpenOffice.org, Firefox and Thunderbird.

National Assembly
The National Assembly of France has had plans to migrate to Linux, OpenOffice.org and Firefox.

Germany

Munich 

The German City of Munich in 2003 announced its intention to switch from Microsoft Windows NT-based operating systems to an open-source implementation of SuSE Linux, In June 2004 after a pilot project run by SuSE Linux and IBM there was a final approval for the migration. On 14 April 2005 the city decided to migrate to Debian from a commercial Linux distribution. An adoption rate of 20% was achieved by 2010.

Schwäbisch Hall 
Schwäbisch Hall migrated its 400 workstations to Linux in late 2002. The factors were cost, better security, escape from the treadmill of vendor-driven upgrades.

Portugal 
The Portuguese Vieira do Minho Municipality began switching to free and open-source software in 2000.

Romania 

IOSSPL is a free and open source software used for public libraries in Romania.

North America

Canada 
In 2017, the city of Sault Ste. Marie, Ontario, opened up most of its new internal software development efforts to reduce its own software costs, and increase collaboration with other municipalities looking to solve similar problems.

United States 
In September, the Commonwealth of Massachusetts announced its formal adoption of the OpenDocument standard for all Commonwealth entities.

In February 2009, the United States White House moved its website to Linux servers using Drupal for content management.

In August 2016, the United States government announced a new federal source-code policy. This policy mandates that at least 20% of custom source code developed by or for any agency of the federal government must be released as open-source software (OSS). In addition, the policy requires that all source code be shared between agencies.  The public release is under a three-year pilot program and agencies are obliged to collect data on this pilot to gauge its performance. The overall policy aims to reduce duplication, avoid vendor 'lock-in', and stimulate collaborative development. A new website  provides "an online collection of tools, best practices, and schemas to help agencies implement this policy", the policy announcement stated. It also provides the "primary discoverability portal for custom-developed software intended both for Government-wide reuse and for release as OSS".  As yet unspecified OSS licenses will be added to the code. The US Chief Information Officer Tony Scott, co-author of the policy, blogged "This is, after all, the People's code. Explore it. Learn from it. Improve it. Use it to propel America's next breakthrough in innovation."

South America

Argentina 
The government of Argentina launched the program Conectar Igualdad (Connect Equality), through ANSES and the Ministry of Education (Argentina) launched during the presidency of Cristina Fernández de Kirchner, that gave kids on public schools free laptops to use for educative purposes. By default, it came with Huayra GNU/Linux, a free and open-source Linux operating system developed by the Argentinian technology ministry, based on Debian, using the MATE Desktop.

Brazil 
The government of Brazil migrated from Microsoft Windows to Linux. In 2006, the Brazilian government also encouraged the distribution of cheap computers running Linux throughout its poorer communities by subsidizing their purchase with tax breaks.

Ecuador 
In April 2008, Ecuador passed a similar law, Decree 1014, designed to migrate the public sector to Libre Software.

Peru 
In 2005, the Government of Peru voted to adopt open source across all its bodies. The 2002 response to Microsoft's critique is available online. In the preamble to the bill, the Peruvian government stressed that the choice was made to ensure that key pillars of democracy were safeguarded: "The basic principles which inspire the Bill are linked to the basic guarantees of a state of law."

Venezuela 
In 2004, a law in Venezuela (Decree 3390) went into effect, mandating a two-year transition to open source in all public agencies. As of June 2009 this ambitious transition is still under way.

See also 

 LiMux  the Munich city migration program
 Linux adoption
 List of Linux adopters
 OpenDocument adoption
 :de:Open-Source-Software in öffentlichen Einrichtungen

References

External links
 Free software in public administration, beta
 https://web.archive.org/web/20080223124448/http://ec.europa.eu/idabc/en/chapter/470 IDABC Open Source Case Studies

Free software